The United States state of Indiana has many former, abandoned, or ghost towns. A study concluded there were at least forty one, two of which were "drowned towns".

List

Anita 
Baltimore
Barbersville
Beeville
Berlin
Brayton
Brisco
Chatterton
Chesapeake
Collins
Conrad
Corwin (Henry County)
Corwin (Tippecanoe County)
Depauw (Harrison County)
Dresser
Dunn
Elkinsville
Elizabeth (Harrison County)
Elizabethtown (Delaware County)
Fort Ritner
Glen Hall
Granville
Heath
Hindostan Falls (Martin County)
Kickapoo
(Old) Leavenworth
Lick Creek African Settlement
Locust Grove (Warren County)
Magnet
Marshfield (Scott County)
Mauckport
Mollie
Monument City (Huntington County)
New Amsterdam
Point Pleasant
Prairieville
Quaker
Randall
Renner
Sheff
Sloan
Springville (Clark County)
Stringtown (Fountain County)
Suman
Toronto
Tremont
Tunnelton
Vermont
Walnut Grove
Warrenton
West Union

See also
Barce, Indiana
Story, Indiana
Lost communities of Porter County, Indiana

Notes and references

External links
Indiana Ghost Towns Directory

 
Indiana
Ghost towns